Hello Brother is a 1994 Indian Telugu-language action comedy film, produced by K. L. Narayana and directed by E. V. V. Satyanarayana. It stars Nagarjuna, Ramya Krishna and Soundarya, with music composed by Raj–Koti. The film is loosely based on the Hong Kong action comedy Twin Dragons (1992). In turn, Hello Brother spawned several of its own remakes, twice in  Hindi as Judwaa (1997) and its reboot Judwaa 2 (2017), in Kannada as Cheluva (1997). The film received positive reviews from both critics and audience and was a super hit at the box office. It was also the highest grossing telugu movie of 1994.

Plot 
Misra is a dacoit. SP Chakravarthy arrests him. Misra wounds himself and is taken to the hospital for the cure, where Chakravarthy is waiting for his wife Geeta, who is pregnant and she gives birth to twins the doctor says that both children have a reflection mentality, which means "if it pains to one other also hurts" depending on the distance. Misra escapes and takes one of the twins with him, hurting Geeta. Chakravarthy pursues him, but is unable to find the child, but shoots Misra. The child is taken by her husband and they adopt him. They have a daughter and one day in an accident at a construction place both are killed. The two children become orphans and they grow up, but the brother Deva with his friend Kasi, another orphan, become thieves for earning. On the other hand, Geetha goes into a coma and Chakravarthy takes her to America for the cure, where the other twin Ravi Varma is brought up. He returns to India as a rock star to give performances. He is received by Giribabu (Chakravarthy's friend), who wishes to marry his daughter Manga to him. But Manga is in love with Deva. At the airport, Ravi Varma falls for Ooha, the daughter of Akkamamba, who is organizing his programs. Simhachalam, Akkamamba's brother, also wishes to marry Ooha. Meanwhile, at home Manga advances with him thinking he is Deva. One day in a restaurant they see each other and find that they are identical, which leads to humorous misunderstandings.

Meanwhile, Deva's sister Kasthuri witnesses a ruthless don and flutist Mitra (Napoleon) son of Misra, who murdered an Inspector on the road for refusing to stay corrupt and providing evidence against him in court. Enraged, Mitra attempts to murder her and Deva fights with him. So Mitra wants to take revenge against Deva, he sends his henchman as the groom to Kasthuri, but Deva breaks up the plan and makes his sister's marriage to another man. Deva obtains all pieces of evidence detailing Mitra's crimes and gets him jailed. Later, the court decides on the death sentence for Mitra. Months pass, Kasthuri becomes pregnant and she is admitted to the hospital for delivery. Deva asks Ravi to stay at the hospital as he is going in search of money, Ravi visits his father Chakravarthy. At the same time, Mitra escapes from jail and comes to the hospital to kidnap Kasthuri and recognizes Chakravarthy, the he who killed his father Misra, and also gets to know that Deva is his son. He blackmails Deva to get Chakravarthy to release Kasthuri. Deva, who does not know that Chakravarthy is his father, goes to his house where Geetha also comes out from the coma by Deva's touch and he discovers that they are his parents. Finally, Deva and Ravi join, protect their father and sister, and bring Mitra to justice and the story ends with the duo marrying their respective ladies.

Cast 

 Nagarjuna as Deva and Ravi Varma (dual role)
 Ramya Krishna as Manga
 Soundarya as Ooha
 Napoleon as Mitra
 Sri Hari as Simhachalam, Ooha's uncle
 Kota Srinivasa Rao as S. I. Thadi Mataiyya turned to Constable
 Brahmanandam as Kaasi
 Ali as Higaral
 Sarath Babu as Chakravarthy
 Giri Babu as Manga's father
 Babu Mohan as Satti Pandu
 Mallikarjuna Rao as Constable Chitti turned to S. I.
 Rajanala as Rajanala
 Charan Raj as Misro, Mitra's father
 Sivaji Raja as Mitra's henchman
 Ananth Babu
 Gautam Raju as Inspector
 Kota Shankar Rao as Inspector
 Madan Mohan as Jailor
 Kadambari Kiran as Sentry
 Ashok Kumar as Chakravarthy's brother-in-law
 Narsing Yadav as Mitra's henchman
 Jenny as Marvadi
 Rambha as dancer in song "Kanne Pettaro"
 Aamani as dancer in song "Kanne Pettaro"
 Indraja as dancer in song "Kanne Pettaro"
 Annapurna as Akkamanba, Ooha's mother
 Sangeetha as Geetha, Hero's mother
 Sudha as Manga's mother
 Sri Lakshmi as Thadi Mataiyya's wife
 Siva Parvathi
 Aruna Sri as Kasthuri, Deva's sister
 Master Uday as Childhood Mitra
 Master Baladitya as Childhood Deva

Production 
Principal photography began with the song "Priya Raagaley".

Soundtrack 

The music was composed by Raj–Koti.

Remakes

Reception 
Griddaluru Gopalrao of Zamin Ryot on his review dated 6 May 1994, appreciated the way the director moulded the characters. He noted that the fast-paced screenplay generated humour in nearly every scene. The film was dubbed in Tamil under the same title.

Awards 
Nandi Awards
 Best Music Director – Raj–Koti (1994) 
 Best Cinematographer - S. Gopal Reddy 
 Best Editor - Ravindra Babu

References

External links 
 

1994 films
Films about twins
Twins in Indian films
Telugu films remade in other languages
Indian romantic comedy films
Indian action comedy films
Films directed by E. V. V. Satyanarayana
Films scored by Raj–Koti
1990s Telugu-language films
1994 romantic comedy films
Indian remakes of Hong Kong films
1994 action comedy films